Polypodium is a genus of ferns in the family Polypodiaceae, subfamily Polypodioideae, according to the Pteridophyte Phylogeny Group classification of 2016 (PPG I). The genus is widely distributed throughout the world, with the highest species diversity in the tropics. The name is derived from Ancient Greek poly (πολύ) "many" + podion (πόδιον) "little foot", on account of the foot-like appearance of the rhizome and its branches. They are commonly called polypodies or rockcap ferns, but for many species unique vernacular names exist.

They are terrestrial or epiphytic ferns, with a creeping, densely hairy or scaly rhizome bearing fronds at intervals along its length. The species differ in size and general appearance and in the character of the fronds, which are evergreen, persisting for 1–2 years, pinnate or pinnatifid (rarely simple entire), and from 10–80 cm or more long. The sori or groups of spore-cases (sporangia) are borne on the back of the frond; they are globose and naked, not covered with a membrane (indusium).

Polypodies have some use in herbalism, but are today most important in horticulture where several species, hybrids, and their cultivars like Polypodium 'Green Wave' are commonly used as ornamental plants for shady locations. Polypodium have a bitter-sweet taste and are among the rather few ferns that are used in cooking; in this case as a spice e.g. for nougat.

Species
Several of the species form hybrids with other species in the genus; these may often be distinguished by being sterile, with very small "blind" sori. , Checklist of Ferns and Lycophytes of the World accepted the following species and hybrids:

Polypodium abitaguae Hook.
Polypodium aequale Maxon
Polypodium alavae A.R.Sm.
Polypodium amorphum Suksd.
Polypodium appalachianum Haufler & Windham
Polypodium arcanum Maxon
Polypodium × aztecum Windham & Yatsk.
Polypodium californicum Kaulf.
Polypodium calirhiza S.A.Whitmore & A.R.Sm.
Polypodium cambricum L.
Polypodium castaneum Maxon ex Tejero
Polypodium chionolepis Sodiro
Polypodium chirripoense Lellinger
Polypodium christensenii Maxon
Polypodium colpodes Kunze
Polypodium conterminans Liebm.
Polypodium diplotrichum Mickel & Beitel
Polypodium eatonii Baker
Polypodium echinolepis Fée
Polypodium × encumeadense (Neuroth, Jäger & Bennert) F.J.Rumsey, Carine & Robba
Polypodium ensiforme Thunb.
Polypodium eperopeutes Mickel & Beitel
Polypodium exsul Mett. ex Kuhn
Polypodium fauriei Christ
Polypodium fissidens Maxon
Polypodium flagellare Christ
Polypodium × font-queri Rothm.
Polypodium fraternum Schltdl. & Cham.
Polypodium glycyrrhiza D.C.Eaton
Polypodium haitiense Urb.
Polypodium × hemipinnatum (Tejero, Mickel & A.R.Sm.) comb. ined.
Polypodium hesperium Maxon
Polypodium hispidulum Bartlett
Polypodium × huancayanum G.Kunkel
Polypodium × incognitum Cusick
Polypodium interjectum Shivas
Polypodium iranicum Mazooji
Polypodium kamelinii Shmakov
Polypodium khasyanum Hook.
Polypodium longipetiolatum Brade
Polypodium macaronesicum Bobrov
Polypodium × mantoniae Rothm.
Polypodium martensii Mett.
Polypodium moricandii Mett.
Polypodium moritzianum Link
Polypodium otites L.
Polypodium oxylepis C.Chr.
Polypodium pellucidum Kaulf.
Polypodium pellucidum Kaulf. f. opacum (Hillebr.) D.D.Palmer
Polypodium pinnatissimum R.C.Moran
Polypodium plectolepidioides Rosenst.
Polypodium plesiosorum Kunze
Polypodium pleurosorum Kunze ex Mett.
Polypodium praetermissum Mickel & Tejero
Polypodium puberulum Schltdl. & Cham.
Polypodium rhodopleuron Kunze
Polypodium riograndense Lindm.
Polypodium × rothmaleri Shivas
Polypodium ryanii Kaulf.
Polypodium saximontanum Windham
Polypodium × schneideri G.Schneid.
Polypodium scouleri Hook. & Grev.
Polypodium sibiricum Sipliv.
Polypodium subpetiolatum Hook.
Polypodium trinidadense Jenman
Polypodium ursipes Moritz ex C.Chr.
Polypodium × vianei Shmakov
Polypodium virginianum L.
Polypodium vulgare L.

A number of species formerly included in the genus have recently been transferred to other genera, including Campyloneurum, Cyathea, Microgramma, Nephrolepis, Pecluma, Phlebodium, Pleopeltis and Serpocaulon. Species placed elsewhere include:
 Polypodium argyrolepis = Serpocaulon lasiopus
 Polypodium mindense = Serpocaulon eleutherophlebium
 Polypodium mixtum = Pleopeltis murora
 Polypodium piligerum = Moranopteris achilleifolia
 Polypodium punctatum Thunb. ex Murray = Hypolepis punctata
 Polypodium quitense = Pecluma dulcis
 Polypodium rimbachii = Serpocaulon sessilifolium
 Polypodium scutulatum = Serpocaulon fraxinifolium

References

 Haufler, Christopher H.; Windham, Michael D.; Lang, Frank A. & Whitmore, S.A. (1993): 2. Polypodium Linnaeus. In: Flora of North America North of Mexico, Vol. 2 (Pteridophytes and Gymnosperms): 315-323. 
 Hyde, H.A.; Wade, A.E. & Harrison, S.G. (1978): Welsh Ferns. National Museum of Wales.
 Royal Botanic Garden Edinburgh (RBGE) (2007): Digital Flora Europaea: Polypodium species list. Retrieved 2007-NOV-26.
 United States Department of Agriculture (USDA) (2007a): Germplasm Resources Information Network - Polypodium. Retrieved 2007-NOV-26.

External links
 

 
Fern genera
Epiphytes